Tomás Perrín (January 4, 1914 – May 10, 1985) was a Mexican film actor. He appeared with María Félix in the historical film The White Monk in 1945.

Filmography

References

Bibliography
 Paco Ignacio Taibo. María Félix: 47 pasos por el cine. Bruguera, 2008.

External links

1914 births
1985 deaths
Mexican male film actors
Male actors from Mexico City
20th-century Mexican male actors